Edmund Tsaturyan (18 March 1937 – 14 May 2010) was an Armenian politician. He attended at the National Polytechnic University of Armenia. Tsaturyan served as a People's Party of Armenia member of the National Assembly of Armenia from 1999 to 2003. He died in May 2010 in Yerevan, at the age of 73.

References 

1937 births
2010 deaths
Politicians from Yerevan
People's Party of Armenia politicians
20th-century Armenian politicians
21st-century Armenian politicians
National Polytechnic University of Armenia alumni
Members of the National Assembly (Armenia)